The London Lions were a motorcycle speedway team that operated for one season during the 1996 Premier League speedway season from the Hackney Wick Stadium, the former home of the Hackney Hawks and the Hackney Kestrels.

Management
The promoter and team manager for that season was former Hackney rider Colin Pratt. Fellow promoters were Ivan Henry and Terry Russell who moved their Arena Essex Hammers promotion into Hackney.

1996 Squad
(c)

League Record
They finished the season in ninth place (out of nineteen) but because the stadium had been newly modernised and the track was not as good as when it was held there previously, crowds were not as high as was hoped for. Speedway had barely returned in 1995 (for the British Grand Prix) when it was announced that the Stadium had passed into the ownership of the receivers. Come the end of the 1996 season there was still no new owner. Racing was never seen at the stadium again. The greyhound racing also vacated the stadium at the end of 1996.

See also
Hackney Wick Wolves
Hackney Hawks
Hackney Kestrels

References

Defunct British speedway teams
Sports clubs established in 1996
Sports clubs disestablished in 1996
Speedway teams in London